The Zenith Brass is a group of 30 talented youth brass and percussion players formed in 1995. Drawing on the brass choir literature for college and professional organizations, the repertoire is new to school band members [1]. Zenith Brass performs a wide variety of transcriptions and original music for brass and percussion. Since 1995, Zenith has provided instruction and motivation for over five hundred members.

Zenith Brass rehearses in Rochester Hills, MI (northern Detroit suburb) on Tuesday evenings from 7 to 9 p.m. from September to May. They perform concerts in November, March and May each year. The concerts feature a wide variety of music designed to be educational for its members and enjoyable for the audience.

Since its inception, Zenith has drawn members from over 90 different school music programs over a wide area. Membership is a supplement to those school music organizations. Zenith gives first priority to its members' commitment to their school music programs. Members are regular participants in the solo and ensemble festivals and study with the best brass teachers in the area.

Zenith Brass is designed for proficient, motivated players. They perform a large amount of music with a minimum of rehearsal.

Zenith was the subject of a feature article Macomb Township Chronicle in January, 2015. Zenith was also featured in articles in the Detroit Free Press in May, 2008 and in the Oakland Press, the Royal Oak Tribune and the Macomb Daily in November, 2000.

History
Zenith director Mark Petty has had many musical interests in his life including piano, percussion, singing, marching bands and drum and bugle corps. He has had an interest in British brass bands dating back to his college days at the University of Michigan. Studying that movement through books, scores and recordings, he came to appreciate the potential of the large brass ensemble. A trip to London for the 1975 International Brass Band Championships in Royal Albert Hall provided a first hand view of the brass band movement.

When Petty concluded his long career with outdoor marching groups, he wanted to dedicate his efforts to concert music in the form of a brass ensemble. He founded the Zenith Brass in 1995 to provide an opportunity for outstanding area youth brass players to make music together and develop their skills in the homogeneous atmosphere of similar instruments.

Starting in 1995 with sixteen players recruited from private teachers' studios, the organization has grown to its current size of 30 members. Zenith Brass has become well known and respected among the area's band directors, private teachers and professional musicians. The ensemble continues to attract and recruit the very best youth brass players in the area and strives to make continuous improvement in its performance levels.

Although the literature for brass ensemble is small compared to orchestra and wind band, Zenith Brass has found and performed over 430 selections for brass ensemble in its short history.

TENTH ANNIVERSARY

On May 20, 2006, Zenith Brass celebrated its Tenth Anniversary Season with a concert including alumni. Pictured is the combined group of 66 musicians following their performance of Stars and Stripes Forever.

Notes
1. Zenith Brass concert history

References

General references
Smith, Katharine, May 18, 2008, "A Chance to Shine", Detroit Free Press (Detroit, MI), Community Section, p. 1
Messer, Rebecca, Nov.17, 2000, "Top Brass", Daily Tribune (Royal Oak, MI)
Selweski, Jeremy, Jan. 15, 2015, "Dakota trumpeter joins prestigious brass group", Chronicle, (Macomb Twp., MI), pg.3A
Stempnik, Rebecca, Nov. 19, 2000, "Teen-agers all-brass band prepares for first concert of the season", Macomb Daily (Mt. Clemens, MI), pg. 12A
Sugameli, Janet, Nov.16, 2000, "Zenith Brass unites young musicians", Oakland Press (Pontiac, MI)

External links
 Zenith Brass Website
 Zenith Brass on Facebook
 German Brass
 Summit Brass
 Harveys Brass Tentet
 Millar Brass
 Chicago Brass Choir
 London Gabrieli Brass
 Detroit Chamber Brass

Musical groups established in 1995
American brass bands